Cavitation is the unstable unhindered expansion of a microscopic void in a solid elastomer under the action of tensile hydrostatic stresses.  This can occur whenever the hydrostatic tension exceeds 5/6 of Young's modulus.

The cavitation phenomenon may manifest in any of the following situations:
 imposed hydrostatic tensile stress acting on a pre-existing void 
 void pressurization due to gases that are generated due to chemical action (as in volatilization of low-molecular weight waxes or oils:  'blowpoint' for insufficiently cured rubber, or 'thermal blowout' for systems operating at very high temperature)
 void pressurization due to gases that come out of solution (as in gases dissolved at high pressure)

References
 

Rubber properties